Vergisson is a commune in the Saône-et-Loire department in the region of Bourgogne-Franche-Comté in eastern France.

Wine
The vineyards of Vergisson form part of the appellation d'origine contrôlée Pouilly-Fuissé.

Gallery

See also
Communes of the Saône-et-Loire department

References

Communes of Saône-et-Loire